The knockout stage of the 2021 Copa América began on 2 July 2021 with the quarter-finals and ended on 10 July 2021 with the final at the Estádio do Maracanã in Rio de Janeiro.

Originally, the knockout stage was scheduled to be played from 4 to 12 July 2020. However, on 17 March 2020 the tournament was postponed until 2021 due to the COVID-19 pandemic in South America.

All match times listed are in BRT (UTC−3).

Format
In the knockout stage, if a match was tied after 90 minutes:
In the quarter-finals, semi-finals and third place play-off, extra time would not be played, and the match would be decided by a penalty shoot-out (Regulations Article 9.3).
In the final, extra time would be played. If still tied after extra time, the match would be decided by a penalty shoot-out (Regulations Article 9.4).

Qualified teams
The top four placed teams from each group qualified for the knockout stage.

Bracket

Quarter-finals

Peru vs Paraguay

Brazil vs Chile

Uruguay vs Colombia

Argentina vs Ecuador

Semi-finals

Brazil vs Peru

Argentina vs Colombia

Third place play-off

Final

Notes

References

External links

Copa América 2021, CONMEBOL.com

Knockout stage